Flódni (also known as Fächertorte in Austria) is a traditional Hungarian Jewish pastry, filled with layers of apple, walnuts, poppy seeds, and plum jam. It is traditionally eaten at Purim and Hanukkah.

History 
Though associated with Hungary, it originated in Ashkenaz (western Germany) before Ashkenazi Jews migrated eastward. After the Holocaust, it has become harder to find in Hungary, but Hungarian Jewish chef Rachel Raj has brought it back into the public consciousness. In 2012, Raj made 1600 pieces of flódni, which if stacked would reach 96 meters tall, the height of the Hungarian parliament building.

References 

Jewish desserts
Ashkenazi Jewish cuisine
Purim foods
Layer cakes
Hungarian pastries
Jews and Judaism in Budapest
Jews and Judaism in Vienna
Pastries with poppy seeds
Apple dishes
Walnut dishes
Plum dishes
Jewish baked goods